is an original Japanese anime television series produced by DMM Pictures and animated by Troyca. It aired from October to December 2022.

Plot
In modern-day Japan, after an attempt is made to kill him, Ittoki Sakuraba learns that he is a direct descendant of and rightful heir to the Iga Ninja clan. His mother sends him to Ninjutsu Gakuen, the only national ninja school in Japan, to study and train as a ninja while investigations are being made to discover who is trying to kill him and why. At the school, Ittoki becomes involved with his new classmates, which include some beautiful yet deadly young ninja girls, but danger is always present...especially when there is a suspected traitor inside the school.

Cast

The main protagonist who escapes a failed assassination attempt and enrolls into the Ninja Academy. He is reluctant to become his clan's next chief but is forced to accept reality as he is thrust into the war between his clan and Koga. 
 

Ittoki's uncle and one of Iga's strongest fighters with a reputation of being called "Tokisada the Demi-God". Despite his laidback attitude, Tokisada is powerful in combat and will not hesitate to go into extremes to complete a mission. 

Ittoki's childhood friend and bodyguard from the Iga village, who was adopted by Yumika. Though her origins are unknown, she wears a face mask. 

Ittoki's mother and the current chief of the Iga village who took over the leadership after the death of her husband. Though she wasn't born into a ninja family, her prudence and courage in the face of death that has earned her the respect of the entire Iga Village. 

She's Ittoki and Kosetsu's classmate who appears to be friendly and weak, however unbeknownst to the two and to Suzaku Ban, she's deceptive and manipulative. She belongs to the Fuma Village, whose ways were conservative and radical, they frown about the changing times and prefers the old ways of the ninja. It is hinted that they wanted the Koga and the Iga to go to war among themselves.  

She belongs to the Saiga village that is already in danger of disappearing, her village was once known as the technological hub of ninjutsu, where during its heydays was the go-to place for ninjutsu tech. She and her father were the last of the said village, but despite her father's reluctance to let her continue the family tradition of being a ninja, she is still hopeful to revive the village and still invents stuff that she and her friends can use.  Despite having moderate fighting skills, she excel in her studies and would often ace any test.  She also excels in the use of technology in conjunction with her ninjutsu.     

Ittoki's classmate and a ninja from the Koga village. Hiding her ninja status, she "became" Ittoki's temporarily girlfriend in an attempt to kill him. After he escapes and Satomi is arrested, she kills herself behind bars. 

Ittoki's rival and classmate from the Ninja Academy. He has a strong prejudiced hate against Ittoki for the Iga clan's murder of Koga's head, a man whom Suzaku had highly admired. 

The main antagonist. Kidō is the current head of the Koga Clan following Kishinmaru's assassination, who rallies the Koga in open hostilities towards the Iga under the pretense of revenge for Kishinmaru's death, framed on Iga. Born with physical deficiencies, Kidō was unable to serve as a Ninja, being made to undergo several medical procedures that sought to augment his physical abilities, which ended in failure and leaving with him scarred for life as he would always remember the pain felt, which became more accentuated with the birth of his more successful brother Kishinmaru. Bitter and resentful for the suffering inflicted on him, Kidō developed a murderous hatred of all Ninjas and their way of life. Eventually Kidō masterminded Kishinmaru's assassination as part of an elaborate ruse to attack the Iga and take over a secret Ninja Core under their possession, said to be the original and most powerful of them all. 

A corrupt member of the NSC. He is a secret collaborator with the Koga Clan.

Iboro

Production and release
Shinobi no Ittoki is produced by DMM Pictures and animated by Troyca. It is directed by Shuu Watanabe, with Minato Takano in charge of the series' scripts, Isamu Suzuki designing the characters and serving as chief animation director, and TOMISIRO composing the music. The series aired from October 4 to December 20, 2022, on Tokyo MX and AT-X. Humbreaders will perform the opening theme song , while Hockrockb will perform the ending theme song . Crunchyroll licensed the series outside of Asia, and have streamed an English dub starting on October 18, 2022.

Episode list

References

External links
 Anime official website 
 

Anime with original screenplays
Crunchyroll anime
Ninja in anime and manga
Troyca
Tokyo MX original programming